Easton may refer to:

Places

Canada
Easton, Nova Scotia

United Kingdom
Easton, Bristol
Easton, Cambridgeshire
Easton, Dorset
Great Easton, Essex and Little Easton, Essex
Easton, Hampshire
Crux Easton, Hampshire
Easton, Isle of Wight
Great Easton, Leicestershire
Easton, Lincolnshire
Easton, Norfolk
Easton Maudit, Northamptonshire
Easton Neston, Northamptonshire
Easton on the Hill, Northamptonshire
Easton, Somerset, near Wells
Easton in Gordano, Somerset
Easton, Suffolk
Easton Bavents, Suffolk
In the county of Wiltshire:
Easton, Bishops Cannings, Wiltshire, near Devizes
Easton, Corsham, Wiltshire
Easton, Pewsey Vale, a parish
Easton Royal, village in the parish
Easton Grey, between Malmesbury and Sherston
Easton Town, Wiltshire, near Sherston

United States
Easton, California
Easton, Connecticut
Easton, Georgia, a former town located in what is now Atlanta
Easton, Illinois
Easton, Kansas
Easton, Maine
Easton, Maryland
Easton, Massachusetts
Easton, Minnesota
Easton, Missouri
Easton, New Hampshire
Easton, New York
Easton, Ohio
Easton, Pennsylvania
Easton, Texas
Easton, Washington
Easton, West Virginia
Easton, Adams County, Wisconsin, a town
Easton (community), Wisconsin, an unincorporated community
Easton, Marathon County, Wisconsin, a town
Easton Town Center, a development in Columbus, Ohio
Easton Township, Michigan

People
Easton (surname), includes a list of notable people
Easton Corbin, American country music singer
Easton Ongaro (born 1998), Canadian soccer player
Easton Stick (born 1995), American football player

Brands and enterprises
Easton Archery, American manufacturer of archery equipment
Easton-Bell Sports, former name of BRG Sports
Easton Hockey
Easton Helsinki, shopping centre in Helsinki, Finland
Easton Press, American book publisher

Other uses
Easton's theorem
 Easton (horse)

See also
Eastern (disambiguation)
Western (disambiguation)
Weston (disambiguation)